Vicente Carattini (November 11, 1939 – November 7, 2005), was a singer and composer of Puerto Rican Christmas-related songs.

Early years
Carattini (birth name:Ernesto Vicente Carattini) was born and raised in the town of Cidra, Puerto Rico where he received his primary and secondary education. His father realized that the young Carattini was fascinated with Puerto Rican folk music and presented him with a Puerto Rican cuatro. A cuatro is a Puerto Rican stringed instrument somewhat similar to a guitar but smaller in size.  The Puerto Rican cuatro has five pairs of strings for a total of ten, and is different from the cuatro in other Latin American countries (for example, the Venezuelan cuatro actually has four strings). At the age of nine, Carattini learned how to play the cuatro by asking those in town who knew how to play the instrument to teach him. In 1950, his father gave him a better quality cuatro and a guitar.

In 1956, when Carattini was 15 years old, he formed the "Trío Los Juglares", which dedicated itself to singing boleros. The trio included the vocals of Felito Félix and performed basically in Cidra. However, Felito Félix left the following year and the trio was dissolved.

Carattini continued to go to school and graduated from the Jesus T. Piñero high school of Cidra. In 1958, he enrolled in the Catholic University of Puerto Rico in Ponce and after one year transferred to the University of Puerto Rico in Río Piedras. In 1960, he earned his teacher's certificate and in 1961 his Bachelor of Science degree. He returned to his hometown and became a teacher.

La Tuna de Cayey

On one occasion Carattini heard a group called "La Tuna de Cayey" sing Puerto Rican Christmas songs and was very impressed. In Puerto Rico "Tunas" are a group of singers and musicians who sing Christmas related songs. One of the songs sung by Tuna de Cayey was "Estas Navidades van a ser Candela" (roughly, "This Christmas season will be a firestorm"), a composition by Herminio de Jesús Figueroa that became part of the Tuna de Cayey's LP production "Candela con la Tuna de Cayey". In 1964, Carattini spoke with a friend, Víctor Cotto, who was the director of another "Tuna" and asked him if he could join.  Carattini became a member of Cotto's "Tuna Taurina de Cayey" and participated in the recording of La Fabulosa Tuna Taurina.  He remained with the group until 1969.

In 1970, he quit his low paying teaching job and became an insurance salesman. He went on to create a new "Tuna" which included 23 members and with $3,000 recorded a "demo". After the recording, they decided that they as a group had a good chance of competing against the "Tunas" already established and adopted the name "Los Cantores de San Juan".

In January 1971, they recorded their first Christmas album, however they had to wait almost a year until the Christmas holidays at the end of the year to release it. Finally, the album was released and became a big hit after being played on the radio by the then DJ Alfred D. Herger. The album included Si no me dan de beber, lloro (If you don't give me a drink, I'll cry), Asomante a los cantores and Porque era Católico. The song has been interpreted by such singers as Danny Rivera and Marco Antonio Muñiz.  Another song which became a Puerto Rican Christmas classic was Dame la Mano Paloma (Give me your Hand, Dove) in 1979.

From then on Carattini and Los Cantores de San Juan performed sold out functions during every Christmas season up to 2005. In 2005, Carattini made his last public appearance on Así es la Navidad, a Gilberto Santa Rosa production.

Discography

Among Carattini's recordings are the following:

 Si no me dan de beber, lloro – 1971
 El caracol – 1972
 Motivos navideños con... Los Cantores de San Juan – 1972
 Éxitos de siempre con Los Cantores de San Juan – 1972
 La puerca voladora – 1972
 De fiesta con Los Cantores de San Juan – 1973
 ¡Es más bueno...! – 1973
 Caminan las nubes / El patatú – 1974
 Idem – 1975
 Idem – 1977
 Dame la mano, paloma – 1979
 Éxitos de siempre con Los Cantores de San Juan, Vol. 2" 1979
 De rolimpín / Pidiendo posada – 1980
¡Se prendió la Navidad! – 1987 with Felito Félix
 Controversia – 1985 with Danny Rivera and Alpha IV
 Trullando con... Vicente Carattini, Chucho Avellanet y... Los Cantores −1986
 De trulla en trulla – 1988
 25 años de Navidad – 1996

Later years
Carattini suffered from leukemia and died on November 7, 2005.  Vicente Carattini is buried in the Jardín del Edén Cemetery of Cidra. The government named a school in his honor. The school is called  which is located at 782 km 6 2 Barrio Ceiba, in the town of Cidra.

See also

 List of Puerto Ricans
 Corsican immigration to Puerto Rico
List of Puerto Rican songwriters
Music of Puerto Rico

References

External links
 Vicente Carattini changed the history of our Christmas folklore
 Vicente Carattini CD Collection
La Tuna de Cayey 

1939 births
2005 deaths
People from Cidra, Puerto Rico
Puerto Rican people of Corsican descent
University of Puerto Rico alumni
Deaths from leukemia
Puerto Rican singer-songwriters
20th-century Puerto Rican male singers
Puerto Rican male composers
Deaths from cancer in Puerto Rico
American male singer-songwriters